is a  quasi-national park in the Tōkai region of Honshū in Japan. It is rated a protected landscape (category III) according to the IUCN. As with neighboring Hida-Kisogawa Quasi-National Park and Tenryū-Okumikawa Quasi-National Park the park includes mountainous landscapes with gorges and dense forests. The part is on the border between Shizuoka and Aichi Prefecture, but is entirely within Aichi. It also includes a portion of the Tōkai Nature Trail. It encompasses the area around Yahagi Dam and the Kourankei scenic areas. The area was designated a quasi-national park on December 28, 1970.

Like all Quasi-National Parks in Japan, the park is managed by the local prefectural governments.

See also
List of national parks of Japan

References
Southerland, Mary and Britton, Dorothy. The National Parks of Japan. Kodansha International (1995).

External links
 

National parks of Japan
Parks in Aichi Prefecture
Protected areas established in 1970